Noël Emmanuel Limage (died January 20, 2007) was a Haitian senator with the Lespwa party. In the 2006 election, he won a seat representing Artibonite in the senate, but was killed in a car accident near Gonaïves less than a year after taking office. He was driving his car on a rural road when he swerved to avoid a cow and crashed into a ravine. He was taken to a hospital, where he died of head injuries. Two passengers in the car survived the accident; Limage's secretary suffered a broken leg and his cousin escaped uninjured.

The Constitution of Haiti stipulated that a special election should have been held within thirty days of Limage's death to fill his senate seat. Because Haiti lacks a permanent electoral commission, the special election did not take place and his seat remains empty. The position will be contested in the upcoming 2008 elections.

Notes 

1953 births
2007 deaths
Members of the Senate (Haiti)
Road incident deaths in Haiti
Lespwa politicians